The 2020 Mercer Bears football team represented Mercer University as a member the Southern Conference (SoCon) during the 2020–21 NCAA Division I FCS football season. They were led by first-year head coach Drew Cronic and played their home games at the Five Star Stadium in Macon, Georgia. Mercer finished the season 5–6 overall and 5–3 in SoCon play to place fourth.

Previous season
The Bears finished the 2019 Mercer Bears football team 4–8 overall an 3–5 in SoCon play to place seventh.

Schedule
Mercer had a game scheduled against Vanderbilt, which was canceled due to the COVID-19 pandemic.

Game summaries

at Jacksonville State

at Army

Abilene Christian

References

Mercer
Mercer Bears football seasons
Mercer Bears football